Harnam Singh Saini (died March 16, 1917) was a notable Indian revolutionary who participated in Ghadar Mutiny and was hanged by British colonial government on 16 March 1917 in Lahore for instigating revolt against the empire. He was tried under third Lahore Conspiracy Case trial.

Background 

Harnam Singh Saini was the son of Gopal Saini. He was resident of village Fatehgarh in district Hoshiarpur.

Involvement in Ghadar Mutiny 

Harnam Singh visited Canada and USA which were the breeding ground of Ghadar Conspiracy. He became an active member of Ghadar Party and  participated in sedition.

Arrest

Harnam Singh Saini was arrested in Batavia, a Dutch colony. Nothing incriminating was found on his person or on the ship Maverick in which he was travelling. In spite of this the Dutch authorities of Batavia heeded to the British request and handed him over to the Singapore police. He was taken to Calcutta and then to Lahore.

Trial and execution 

He was tried under Third Conspiracy Case at Lahore. The tribunal of this case consisted of Ellis, Major Frizelle, and Rai Bahadur Gopal Das Bhandari. The trial was held in Lahore Central Jail.

The trial began on 8 November 1916 and ended on 5 January 1917. Harnam Singh Saini along with four other Ghadar revolutionaries, namely, Bhai Balwant Singh of Khurdpur, Babu Ram of Fatehgarh, Hafiz Abdullah of Jagraon and Dr. Arur Singh of Sanghowal, was charged with waging war against King Emperor and sentenced to death. Three other co-accused, namely, Karar Singh Nawan Chand, Fazal Din of Fategarh and Munsha Singh Dukhi of Jandiala were given life imprisonment.

Saini, along with four of his other Ghadar Party comrades, was executed on 16 March 1917.  All of their properties were also confiscated.

See also 
 List of Saini people
Lahore Conspiracy Case trial
Ghadar Party
Kartar Singh Sarabha
Hindu–German Conspiracy

References

Other sources 
Ghadar Party Da Itihas, Desh Bhagat Yaadgar Hall Committee, Jullundur
 Unpublished Account of Ghadar Party Conspiracy Cases, 1914-1918 by Isemonger and Slattery
 Sir Michael O'Dwyer, India as I knew it, London, 1925

Hindu–German Conspiracy
Ghadar Party
1916 deaths
Revolutionary movement for Indian independence
Indian revolutionaries
Punjabi people
Indian Sikhs
People from Hoshiarpur
Executed Indian people
People executed by British India by hanging
Year of birth missing